The Casanatense chansonnier (I-Rc MS 2856) was a major collection of Renaissance vocal music made in Ferrara , including compositions from Europe's leading composers.

Overview
It was likely compiled for Isabella d'Este's marriage to Francesco II Gonzaga. It included works from a wide variety of composers, including musicians in Italy such as Alexander Agricola, Loyset Compère, Jean Japart and Johannes Martini, as well as French and Netherlandish composers such as Antoine Busnois, Hayne van Ghizeghem, Josquin des Prez and Johannes Ockeghem.

Among the compositions included is Josquin's popular Adieu mes amours.

References

Citations

Sources

Further reading
 Lockwood, Lewis, ed. A Ferrarese Chansonnier: Roma, Biblioteca Casanatense 2856: “Canzoniere di Isabella d’Este.” Lucca: Libreria Musicale Italiana, 2002.

External link
 
 

Renaissance music
Renaissance music manuscript sources
Josquin des Prez
Chansonniers (books)
French manuscripts